Kyzyl-Korgon is a village in Osh Region of Kyrgyzstan. It is part of the Aravan District. Its population was 1,072 in 2021.

References

Populated places in Osh Region